Chang Kiha (born February 20, 1982) is a South Korean singer-songwriter, actor, essay writer and radio host. He is best known as the lead singer of the indie rock band Kiha & The Faces.

Early life
Chang was born in Seoul on February 20, 1982. His father ran a manufacturing company, and Chang later said he did not experience any financial hardships growing up. Chang graduated from the prestigious Seoul National University. While in college, he played drums for the rock group Nunco Band.

Career

Music 

Chang debuted with his indie rock band Kiha & The Faces in 2008. The band's first single, "Cheap Coffee," was a hit, and the band has since become one of South Korea's most popular indie rock groups.

Acting 
In 2013, Chang made his acting debut playing supporting role on the daily sitcom Potato Star 2013QR3. He received positive reviews from the public for his portrayal of guitarist Jang Yul.

Radio 
Chang hosted the radio show Chang Kiha's Great Radio on SBS Power FM from 2012 to 2015. He left the show to focus on his music career.

Music style

Kiha is known for his specific style of music, where he "talks like he sings, sings like he talks.”

Kiha does his own thing. Dramabeans have once reviewed him as "the guy who's so unconcerned with being cool that he IS cool. By ignoring trends, he thereby sets his own."

Personal life 
On October 8, 2015, Chang and IU declared they had been in a romantic relationship from 2013. Despite remaining in good terms as friends, they split in January 2017.

Discography

Kiha and The Faces

Filmography

Variety shows

Television series

Web shows

References

External links 
 

1982 births
Living people
South Korean folk rock singers
South Korean rock guitarists
South Korean drummers
South Korean television personalities
South Korean male television actors
South Korean radio presenters
Musicians from Seoul
Seoul National University alumni
21st-century South Korean male  singers
21st-century guitarists
21st-century drummers
South Korean male singer-songwriters